Better than sex cake, also known as the better than Robert Redford cake or better than best cake, is a cake consisting of a chocolate cake mix, of the maker's choosing, a moist center, and whipped cream covering the exterior. One version of the cake featured by Paula Deen on her series Paula's Home Cooking calls for yellow cake mix, canned pineapple, vanilla pudding, heavy cream, and toasted coconut flakes.

The cake's moist center is typically created by inserting a fork into the cake several times and filling the holes with a mixture containing sugar and a flavoring or fruit such as pineapple. It is traditionally baked using a 13 by 9 by 2-inch pan and then refrigerated and eaten cold. The basic recipe for the cake has been altered depending on the tastes of the person making the cake and alternates include vanilla, banana, or candy flavors.

See also
 List of cakes

References

External links 
 Recipe at Paula Deen's website

Cakes